Tayene is a rural locality in the local government areas (LGA) of Break O'Day, Dorset and Launceston in the North-east and Launceston LGA regions of Tasmania. The 2016 census recorded a population of 9 for the state suburb of Tayene.

History 
Tayene was gazetted as a locality in 1963.

Geography
Several streams flow from the southern part of the locality to the North Esk River, which forms a small part of the southern boundary.

Road infrastructure 
Route C405 (Camden Road / Camden Hill Road) passes through from south to north-west.

References

Towns in Tasmania
Localities of Break O'Day Council
Localities of Dorset Council (Australia)
Localities of City of Launceston